Hrvatski Nogometni Klub Drinovci, commonly referred to as HNK Drinovci or simply Drinovci, is a football club from Drinovci, Bosnia and Herzegovina.

History
Until 2003 the club was known as NK Boljava. They currently play in the Cantonal league West Herzegovina, which is part of the fourth tier of the Bosnian football league system. Hailing from a small village at the Croatian border, they were relegated from the second level-First League (Prva Liga FBiH) when they finished in 11th place in the 2007/08 season.

Club seasons
Source:

References

Grude
Football clubs in Bosnia and Herzegovina
Croatian football clubs in Bosnia and Herzegovina
Sport in the Federation of Bosnia and Herzegovina